Idi is a Pahoturi language spoken in Western Province, Papua New Guinea. The so-called Pahoturi dialects form a dialect chain with Idi proper at one end and Agob proper at the other.

Name
The language has been also known as Diblaeg, Dibolug, Dimisi, Dimsisi.
Tame is a dialect distinct from Idi.

Social context
Idi is in contact with other Papuan languages of different families, including Nen, Nambo, and the closely related Agob.

Phonology
Idi phonemic inventory:

Consonants p, t, ʈ, k, kʷ, b, d, ɖ, ɡ, ɡʷ, m, n, ɲ, ŋ, ᵐb, ⁿd, ᶯɖ, ᵑɡ, ᵑɡw, ʤ, ⁿʤ, l, ʎ, r, j, w

Tense vowels (in stressed open syllables) a, æ, i, e, o, u, e
Lax vowels (not in stressed open syllables) ı, ɐ

See also
Agob language

References

External links
 Idi language documentation project
 Map showing the location of Idi (#647).

Pahoturi languages
Languages of Western Province (Papua New Guinea)